Hinchinbrook is a locality in the Cassowary Coast Region, Queensland, Australia.

Geography 
The locality consists of a number of islands off the Queensland coast. The largest is Hinchinbrook Island while the others are very small in comparison. To the north of Hinchinbrook Island are Garden Island, Goold Island, and the Brook Islands (North Island, Tween Island, Middle Island and South Island). To the east of Hinchinbrook Island are Eva Island and Agnes Island. To the west of Hinchinbrook Island in the Hinchinbrook Channel (which separates the island from the mainland) is a group of low-lying islands called the Benjamin Flats and Haycock Island.

Much of the locality is protected from development including the Hinchinbrook Island National Park (covering the whole of Hinchinbrook Island, Eva Island, Agnes Island and Haycock Island), Goold Island National Park (covering all of Goold Island) and Brook Islands National Park (including North Island, Tween Island and Middle Island, but not South Island).

Hinchinbrook Island is quite mountainous with several peaks, the highest ones being  Barra Castle Hill,  Mount Bowen,  The Thumb,  Mount Diamantina and  Mount Straloch.

Benjamin Flats are a sheltered area good for fishing for barramundi, fingermark bream, black jewfish, and big golden grunter.

History 

References

External links 

 
 
 

Cassowary Coast Region
Localities in Queensland